Oyayubihime may refer to:
Oyayubihime (Thumb Princess), a television movie series starring Chiaki Kuriyama
Oyayubihime Infinity, a manga series